Made in Heaven is a 1921 American silent comedy film directed by Victor Schertzinger and starring Tom Moore, Helene Chadwick and Molly Malone.  The film is considered to be lost.

Plot
William Lowry, an Irish immigrant, rescues Claudia Royce from a burning building, and upon hearing that her parents are trying to force her to accept millionaire Leland, whom she does not love, he proposes a marriage of convenience to himself. She accepts, and Bill arranges a fake ceremony; but when she falls in love with Davidge, Bill refuses her a "divorce." Later, Bill gets rich in the manufacture of a patented fireman's pole, and when he buys a house for Claudia she realizes her love for him and they are legally married.

Cast
 Tom Moore as William Lowry 
 Helene Chadwick as Claudia Royce
 Molly Malone as Elizabeth Royce
 Kate Lester as Mrs. Royce
 Al W. Filson as Mr. Royce
 Freeman Wood as Davidge
 Charles Eldridge as Lowry Sr.
 Renée Adorée as Miss Lowry
 Herbert Prior as Leland
 Fronzie Gunn as Ethel Hadden
 John Cossar as Mr. Hadden

See also
List of lost films

References

External links

 Made in Heaven
Made in Heaven

1921 films
American silent feature films
Films directed by Victor Schertzinger
1921 comedy films
Lost American films
Goldwyn Pictures films
American black-and-white films
Silent American comedy films
1921 lost films
Lost comedy films
1920s American films